Zugliano is a town in the province of Vicenza, Veneto, Italy. It is north of SP111.

Twin towns
Agordo

Sources

(Google Maps)

Cities and towns in Veneto